Nampally is a village in Nalgonda district of the Indian state of Telangana. It is the headquarters of Nampally Mandal of Devarakonda division. Nampally mandal had 30 villages under it. The famous hindu temple Chalidona LaxmiNarasimha Swami temple is just 25 km far away from the mandal headquarters.

Here is the link for temple 

https://www.youtube.com/watch?v=8aoIwm3CkY8

References 

Villages in Nalgonda district
Mandal headquarters in Nalgonda district